Hidden Treasures Miss Nepal 2012, the 16th Miss Nepal beauty pageant, was held on May 6, 2012 at the Hotel Del Annapurna in Kathmandu. Miss Nepal 2011 Malina Joshi crowned Shristi Shrestha as Miss Nepal World 2012, who represented Nepal at Miss World 2012 with Nagma Shrestha and Subekshya Khadka crowned as Miss Nepal Earth 2012 and Miss Nepal International 2012 who went to Miss Earth 2012 and Miss International 2012 respectively.

The 16 shortlisted young women aged 19 years and above competed for the main title and the pageant was live telecast on NTV with Sahana Bajracharya and Biraz Singh Khadka as the hosts.

Results

Color keys

Sub-titles

Contestants

Notes
 Contestant #04, Nagma Shrestha was Miss College Ambassador 2008 & Miss Colleges 2009.
 Contestant #05, Subeksya Khadka was top 5 finalists in Miss Ecollege 2010.
 Contestant #06, Bandana Tandukar was 2nd runner-up in Miss Newa 2007.
 Contestant #07, Heena Shrestha was the 2nd runner up of Miss Purwanchal 2012.
 Contestant #08, Prasansha Rana competed in Miss Nepal 2011 and ended in top 10.
 Contestant #12, Anjali Pradhanang was the 1st runner up of Miss Teen Nepal 2010.
 Contestant #13, Akesha Bista has been awarded as Best Catwalk model at 2011 Nepal Fashion Week.
 Contestant #16, Alisha Kunwar was the 2nd runner up of Miss Teen Nepal 2010.
 Contestant #17, Indira Rai made it to top 10 semi finalists in Miss Purwanchal 2011.
 Originally there have been 17 shortlisted finalists for the finale but due to personal problems (#11) Rashmita Maharjan winner of Mega Model Season 2. has left the competition remaining with 16 candidates left.

References

External links
 Miss Nepal Official Website

Beauty pageants in Nepal
2012 in Nepal
Miss Nepal